Thomai Lefousi (born 14 March 1971) is a former Greek female alpine skier. She competed in the 1988, 1992 and 1994 Winter Olympics. She is also the elder sister of fellow Greek alpine skier, Thomas Lefousi.

References 

1971 births
Living people
Greek female alpine skiers
Alpine skiers at the 1988 Winter Olympics
Alpine skiers at the 1992 Winter Olympics
Alpine skiers at the 1994 Winter Olympics
Olympic alpine skiers of Greece